The St. Charles Public Library is a library in St. Charles, Minnesota.  It is a member of Southeastern Libraries Cooperating, the southeast Minnesota library region. The library's annual circulation is 44,000 and houses a collection of 23,000 books, magazines, CDs and DVDs.

References

External links 
 Online Catalog
 Southeastern Libraries Cooperating

Southeastern Libraries Cooperating
Buildings and structures in Winona County, Minnesota
Education in Winona County, Minnesota